is a passenger railway station  located in the city of Kawanishi, Hyōgo Prefecture, Japan. It is operated by the private transportation company Nose Electric Railway.

Lines

Station layout
The station two unnumbered opposed ground-level side platforms. There is no connection between platforms. The platforms have an effective length of 6 cars, but currently only 4-car trains stop. The station is unattended.

Platforms

Adjacent stations

History
Kinunobebashi Station opened on April 13, 1913.

Passenger statistics
In fiscal 2019, the station was used by an average of 2035 passengers daily

Surrounding area
This station is located near the prefectural border between Kawanishi and the city of Ikeda, Osaka, and about 50 meters to the east is the Kinenbashi Bridge, which gave the station its name.
Kawanishi Municipal Kinen Housing Complex

See also
List of railway stations in Japan

References

External links 

 Kinunobebashi Station official home page 

Railway stations in Hyōgo Prefecture
Stations of Nose Electric Railway
Railway stations in Japan opened in 1913
Kawanishi, Hyōgo